Christian Gaudin was a French film editor. He worked on more than sixty productions during his career.

Selected filmography
 The Lafarge Case (1938)
 The Train for Venice (1938)
 Whirlwind of Paris (1939)
 The Murderer Lives at Number 21 (1942)
 Adrien (1943)
 Majestic Hotel Cellars (1945)
 Song of the Clouds (1946)
 After Love (1948)
 Dilemma of Two Angels (1948)
 The Lovers Of Verona (1949)
 Branquignol (1949)
 Justice Is Done (1950)
 Rendezvous in Grenada (1951)
 Imperial Violets (1952)
 Spring, Autumn and Love (1955)
 The Terror with Women (1956)
 Mademoiselle and Her Gang (1957)
 Sergeant X (1960)
 Ravishing (1960)
 Women Are Like That (1960)
 Constance aux enfers (1963)
 Your Turn, Darling (1963)
 Hardi Pardaillan! (1964)
 Marvelous Angelique (1965)
 The Sleeping Car Murders (1965)
 Angelique and the King (1966)
 Untamable Angelique (1967)
 Angelique and the Sultan (1968)
 The Private Lesson (1968)

References

Bibliography
 Waldman, Harry. Maurice Tourneur: The Life and Films. McFarland, 2001.

External links

Year of birth unknown
Year of death unknown
French film editors